The Moje College Of Education is a state government higher education institution located in Erin Ile, Kwara State, Nigeria.

History 
The Moje College Of Education was established in 2017.

Courses 
The institution offers the following courses;

 Economics
 Computer Education
 Geography
 French
 Political Science
 Biology
 Social Studies
 Islamic Studies
 Christian Religious Studies
 English
 Yoruba
 Arabic
 Primary Education Studies
 Integrated Science

References 

Universities and colleges in Nigeria
2017 establishments in Nigeria